The British Open Show Jumping Championships were launched in 2003 and have been held indoors during April of every year since.

For the first four years they were held at Sheffield Arena before moving to the NEC Arena, Birmingham in 2007.

The Championships have a unique competition format with the champion being determined by ongoing placings in three qualifying rounds and the final. The British Open title has become much coveted. One of the reasons for this is its policy of only inviting the top British and international show jumpers to compete. In its international classes, only the best (as defined by the British Showjumping Association) can participate.

The British Open also hosts national show jumping classes and is the Final for the BSJA Winter Grand Prix and the BEF Under 23 Classic and Championship.

In 2011 the British Open Show Jumping did not run because the organizer had not had one profitable year in the last eight years.

Previous British Open Champions 

2003   Robert Whitaker 
2004   Nick Skelton 
2005   Robert Smith 
2006   Robert Smith 
2007   Jessica Kurten 
2008   Robert Whitaker 
2009   Robert Whitaker 
2010   Ellen Whitaker

External links 
 Official Website

Show jumping events
Equestrian sports in the United Kingdom
2003 establishments in the United Kingdom
Recurring sporting events established in 2003